The Sinister Pig is the sixteenth crime fiction novel in the Joe Leaphorn / Jim Chee Navajo Tribal Police series by Tony Hillerman, first published in 2003. It was a New York Times best-seller.

A mystery involving diverted oil and gas revenues, abandoned pipelines, Washington D.C. insiders, and illegal drugs involves Navajo Tribal Police Sergeant Jim Chee and Bernadette Manuelito, now a federal Border Patrol officer. Each turns to retired Lt. Joe Leaphorn, now called legendary by his colleagues as well as by Chee, for assistance. Along the way, elegant and dramatic romances reach happy conclusions.

Plot summary

Not long after Carl Manken leaves Washington D.C. to investigate an issue in the news, his murdered corpse is found on the edge of the Checkerboard part of the Navajo Reservation, near the Apache Jicarilla Reservation. Soon, his vehicle is found on the Jicarilla Reservation. Each use of Manken's credit card is monitored by the issuer, a high-level intervention that sends Sgt. Chee and FBI Agent Osborne to retrieve the card from the workmen using it after finding it in trash they picked up. In Washington D.C., the newsworthy issue is the large amount of royalties never paid to the tribes who own the land providing natural resources, including oil, natural gas and coal; the tribes are suing the Department of Interior.

Bernadette Manuelito is on routine surveillance in her new position as a US Customs Patrol Officer, when she finds the Tuttle ranch in the boot heel of New Mexico, where a truck with Mexican license plates enters. She investigates, taking photos of the exotic wildlife and the construction project underway, described as a pump for water for the oryxes and ibexes. She shares the prints of her photos with Sgt. Chee, who in turn shares them with Lt. Leaphorn. One of the trucks in her photos is from Seamless Weld of El Paso, Texas, the same company that the dead man reported as his employer on the rental car form. Her boss, Ed Henry, takes the negatives and other set of prints, while taking a photo of her and telling her to leave the ranch alone. On her first successful solo netting, taking in a group of illegal aliens, the brother-in-law in the group recognizes Manuelito from photos circulating among the drug dealers in Sonora, with word to kill her. Her roommate Mrs. Garza calls Leaphorn with this information, because Manuelito will not call Chee. Leaphorn finds that the pathway of the unused pipeline from the now disused Mexican copper mine passes right through the Tuttle ranch, shown on an old map when the smelter was active. He figures the work recently done at each place is to get the pipeline working again, either to divert natural gas or oil southbound, or to bring in drugs, northbound. The Tuttle ranch is a lease on BLM lands, giving Dashee authority to be there; he and Sgt. Chee head for the ranch directly.

Directed by her boss to the Tuttle ranch, Manuelito finds herself in an awkward position. The usually locked and guarded gate is swinging open, and no one is in sight. She drives to the building, climbing on her vehicle to look in through the only windows. Three men approach her; Winsor aims his hunting rifle at her. Her weapon is taken by Diego and the four proceed inside the building. Manuelito sees the drugs at the opening from the pipeline. Winsor plans to execute her. Budge tells her in Spanish to claim she is from DEA and willing to take a cut of the money Winsor will get from the amount of drugs she sees, which she does. Winsor talks about the mistaken killing of Manken, who was not involved in illegal drugs, but hunting out the situation on royalties owed for resources extraction, and mentions the fate of Chrissy. Budge takes her weapon from Diego while Manuelito kicks the rifle. Winslow hits her with the butt of the rifle; then Budge shoots Winslow. Budge tends to her wound. He and Diego leave. Manuelito sits in her vehicle, after calling her own dispatcher and the state police for assistance. Sgt. Chee and Cowboy Dashee arrive at the ranch to find her resting in her vehicle. This scene evokes the words from Chee that he loves Bernie, words he could not say these six months. Then he and Dashee listen to what happened, and see the private airplane above, heading for Mexico. Customs officers, the FBI, the DEA, the state and county police, and Dashee of the Bureau of Land Management discuss who has authority, until someone from Homeland Security arrives to trump them all. Manuelito takes pain medication from the medics, who take her to the hospital. In the Epilog: Away in Mexico, Budge finds Chrissy, whom he did not kill, as he loves her and asks her to marry him. Back in Shiprock, Manuelito looks over the trailer that serves Chee as home, suggesting they move it away and build a real house.

Characters

 Joe Leaphorn: Retired Lieutenant from the Navajo Tribal Police, widowed. He lives in Window Rock, Arizona.
 Jim Chee: Sergeant in the Navajo Tribal Police. He lives in Shiprock, New Mexico near the San Juan River. 
 Bernadette Manuelito: U.S. Customs Patrol officer (CPO at the border with Mexico) for the last six months. She resigned from the Navajo Tribal Police. She loves Chee. Introduced in The Fallen Man.
 Albert Cowboy Dashee: Bureau of Land Management security officer. He is Hopi and a long-time friend to Chee. Instroduced in The Dark Wind
 Captain Largo: Chee's superior officer in the Shiprock office of the NTP.
 Louisa Bourebonette: Professor of cultural anthropology with an interest in origin stories. She is a good friend to Leaphorn, who uses Leaphorn's spare room as a base for her dispersed interviews. Introduced in Coyote Waits.
 Carl Mankin: Alias of a retired CIA Agent who is sent to investigate the alleged revenue misappropriations by an unnamed US senator, found murdered. He was Gordon Stein, per Mary Goddard. He was a man over 60, trained as a petroleum engineer who worked also with the CIA. 
 Jerry "Oz" Osborne: FBI Special Agent in the Gallup, NM office, originally assigned to the case, now overtaken by the Washington, D.C. office. Introduced in The Wailing Wind.
 Tom O'Day: He guards the gate at the Tuttle ranch the first time Manuelito arrives there.
 Rawley Winsor: Wealthy and unscrupulous man who lives in Washington D.C., but has business interests and holdings in New Mexico, mainly as a primary supplier of illegal drugs. He is married, and a stout man in appearance. He is considered a Washington power broker.
 Robert Budge: Rawley Winsor's chauffeur and private pilot, who is wanted for arrest in Guatemala during times of political unrest there. Also known as Silvanios Roberto C de Baca, with deep roots in Spain, he is a tall, athletic man.
 Diego de Vargas: Once a colonel in the Mexican military, now the Mexican partner for Winsor's work. He drives the truck that Manuelito follows to the Tuttle ranch. He has more in common with Budge than with Winsor.
 Chrissy: Law school student who works for Winsor, and had an affair with him. She thinks he will marry her when she gets pregnant, but he has other plans for her.
 Ed Henry: Officer Manuelito's supervisor in the U.S. Border Patrol, with links to The Man on the East Coast.
 Eleanda Garza: Border Patrol agent, housemate of Officer Manuelito, and member of the Tohono O'odham Nation (the Desert People).
 Dan Monday: Retired US prosecutor who comes to speak with Leaphorn about the murder and the royalties case.
 Jason Ackerman: Attorney friend of Monday, who works in Washington, D.C., and joins Monday in the search for information on the powerful forces at play in the investigation of the murder on the Navajo Reservation.
 Mary Goddard: Reporter for a national news magazine, U.S. News & World Report, who interviews Leaphorn.

Reviews

Marilyn Stasio points to an extraordinary display of sheer plotting craftsmanship:

Tony Hillerman was just waiting for someone to invent the Department of Homeland Security. As if the jurisdictional power struggles among the F.B.I., the D.E.A., the Border Patrol, the Department of Land Management and the Navajo Tribal Police were not enough to cripple local law enforcement on the Indian reservations where Hillerman sets his novels, an über-agency like Homeland Security comes along to create total confusion. Hillerman orchestrates the chaos brilliantly in THE SINISTER PIG (HarperCollins, $25.95), devising a plot that draws all these interested parties to a lonely dirt road in the San Juan Basin in New Mexico (the very heart of America's version of the Persian Gulf), where an undercover agent has been murdered while investigating possible criminal sabotage of the oil pipelines. Sgt. Jim Chee of the Navajo police and his retired mentor, Joe Leaphorn, are quick to pick up on the implications for a federal inquiry into some $40 billion in oil revenues that never made it into the Tribal Trust Fund. But the F.B.I. elbows them off the case, and it is left to a rookie, Bernadette Manuelito, working Border Patrol near Mexico, to follow the cynical scheme to its bedrock, allowing Hillerman to tie all three investigative strands together in an extraordinary display of sheer plotting craftsmanship.

Kirkus Reviews finds this novel to be light on plot, the mystery too easy to solve:

Though you might expect them to have their hands full with rumors of war, Washington powerbrokers seem obsessed these days with whatever's happening in the big-sky New Mexico territory Hillerman's long since branded as his own (The Wailing Wind, 2002, etc.). Soon after one D.C. insider equips an ex-CIA agent with identification in the name of Carl Mankin and sends him out west to investigate rumors that somebody's using a gas pipeline to help avoid payment on part of the staggering $40 billion in royalties the Tribal Trust Fund claims it's never received from the federal government, a second insider sends somebody else out to gun down the investigator, pocket his shiny new identification, and bury him in a shallow grave. Sgt. Jim Chee of the Navajo Tribal Police, looking on as the FBI snatches the case away from him, is lucky to find out the dead man's real name. And retired legend Lt. Joe Leaphorn, when Chee hikes out to Window Rock to consult him, does little more than brandish a sheaf of maps showing the locations of gas pipelines from Mexico. It's Chee's former officer and lost love Bernadette Manuelito, fleeing the NTP for the Customs Patrol, who comes up with the crucial break on the case quite by accident when she follows a truck into a ranch that's raising oryxes for self-styled safari hunters and takes one photograph too many.

Hillerman Lite, with little mystery about who killed Carl Mankin, or, unless you think Hillerman's gotten a lot less warmhearted, about what's going to happen to imperiled Bernie Manuelito.

Publishers Weekly calls this a masterful tale with deeper intrigue and a tighter plot than the prior novel in the series:

Bestseller Hillerman's 16th Chee/ Leaphorn adventure offers deeper intrigue and a tighter plot than his previous entry, The Wailing Wind (2002), in this enduring series. When the body of an undercover agent, who's been looking for clues to the whereabouts of billions of dollars missing from the Tribal Trust Funds, turns up on reservation property near Four Corners, Navajo cop Sgt. Jim Chee and Cowboy Dashee, a Hopi with the Federal Bureau of Land Management, investigate. But the book's real star is officer Bernadette "Bernie" Manuelito, Chee's erstwhile romantic interest, now working in the New Mexico boot heel for the U.S. Border Patrol. The miles have only strengthened her feelings for Chee-and vice versa. A routine patrol puts Bernie on the trail of an operation involving some old oil pipelines that connects to the Four Corners murder. Meanwhile, Joe Leaphorn is checking into the same murder from another direction. The three lines converge on a conspiracy of drugs, greed and power, and those who most profit, including the "sinister pig" of the title, will stop at nothing to keep it a secret. With his usual up-front approach to issues concerning Native Americans such as endlessly overlapping jurisdictions, Hillerman delivers a masterful tale that both entertains and educates.

School Library Journal finds a masterful plot, with appeal to general readers as well as those who follow this series of Hillerman novels:

Adult/High School-Hillerman masterfully juggles the pieces of a puzzle involving billions of dollars in missing oil royalties owed to Native Americans; the drug war; and a badly fragmented bureaucracy. When a stranger is found murdered on Navajo land, Sergeant Jim Chee of the Tribal Police steps in, but before long the investigation is joined-and muddied-by a plethora of government agencies including the FBI, the U.S. Customs Service, and the Bureau of Land Management, and by Navajo, Hopi, and Apache tribal viewpoints. Help comes from two old friends, the retired Lieutenant Joe Leaphorn and the former Navajo tribal policewoman Bernadette Manuelito, who escaped a stalled relationship with Chee to join the U.S. Border Patrol. The victim had been looking into possible fraud using old oil pipelines (hence "sinister pig," a piece of switching equipment). Meanwhile, another kind of sinister pig, the blue-blooded Rawley Winsor, appears at a private ranch in the area, and through his deep involvement in drug trafficking, Hillerman presents a trenchant perspective on the drug war. Winsor's mistress and his driver, two more colorful characters, add an interesting subplot, as do the prickly Bernie and the bashful Chee, when their attraction is reawakened. The story might sound complicated, but the author breezes through, making it look easy. This outing ventures beyond the Navajo landscape that Hillerman's fans expect, but they-and general readers-should enjoy the broader geographical and social canvas just as well, in this tale of ordinary people unraveling knots of fraud and skulduggery.

Title

The title relates to a jargon term in running pipelines. The pig is a piece inserted to clean the pipeline, in more recent days to track the location of leaks and to separate commodities sent through the pipe (e.g., gasoline followed by kerosene). The plot involves two sinister pigs, one in the pipeline and the one who modified the pipeline. Reference is made to a French farming term for the pig in a farmyard who will eat all it can, then block the other pigs from eating, le cochon sinistre, which is the title of this volume in France.

Natural, Cultural & Historical References

Geographic, botanical, animal, historical, and cultural artifacts and events often play key roles in the Chee/Leaphorn series - either as direct plot elements, to explain character motivations or perspectives, or to illustrate cultural or 
religious beliefs and practices.  Although less true here than for many other novels in the series, such references in The Sinister Pig include:

 ANIMAL:   Scimitar oryx (exotic game animal raised on the Tuttle Ranch)
 GEOGRAPHICAL: Bernadette Manuelito is assigned to patrol the basin and range topography of the rugged Animas Mountains of Hidalgo County in the extreme southwestern corner of New Mexico, also called the boot heel of New Mexico. Manuelito stays in Rodeo. Chee is based in Shiprock, New Mexico, while Leaphorn is in Window Rock, Arizona. The murdered man is found on the Checkerboard reservation, while his car is found in the Jicarilla Reservation. The lands of the eastern portion of the Navajo Nation, in New Mexico, are called the Checkerboard reservation. This arose from the way in which land was given to railroads in the 19th century, leaving questions of who owns land, a problem for police jurisdictions among others.
 HISTORICAL:  Guatemalan Civil War (motivation for de Baca); Institutional Revolutionary Party (historic basis for de Vargas military association); Phelps Dodge mining and minerals company (historic basis for mines and smelters in southern New Mexico and Arizona); Cobell v. Kempthorne (class-action lawsuit involving claims that the U.S. government incorrectly accounted for Indian trust assets).

Narrative style

Each chapter of the novel is from the viewpoint of a specific character, rather than the views of Chee or Leaphorn alone. For example, the reader knows what sort of man Winsor is before Chee, Leaphorn or Manuelito know. At the end, Dashee and Chee get lost en route, while Manuelito is facing her tormentor and her two unexpected allies in a small building on the Tuttle ranch.

See also

 The Minerals Management Service of the U.S. Department of the Interior
 Pipeline pigging

References

External links
The Sinister Pig (2003) at Tony Hillerman Portal in University of New Mexico Library
Google Books limited preview of The Sinister Pig

2003 American novels
Novels by Tony Hillerman
Novels set in Arizona
Novels set in New Mexico
HarperCollins books